The Danish Royal Enclaves were the territory of the Kingdom of Denmark which was located within the Duchy of Schleswig. After the Second Schleswig War, most of these areas were, like the rest of Schleswig, ceded to the Kingdom of Prussia. Most of these areas were returned after the 1920 Schleswig plebiscites.

Further reading 
 
 
 

Geographic history of Denmark
Schleswig Wars
1920 in Denmark